is a Japanese former competitive ice dancer. She competed with Hiroshi Tanaka. They placed 23rd in the 1998 Winter Olympic Games. They were two-time Japanese national champions.

Results
GP: Champions Series / Grand Prix

With Tanaka

With Tsuchiya

See also 
Figure skating at the 1988 Winter Olympics

References 
1998 Japanese Olympic Committee - Aya Kawai profile

1975 births
Living people
Japanese female ice dancers
Olympic figure skaters of Japan
Sportspeople from Tokyo
Figure skaters at the 1998 Winter Olympics
Asian Games medalists in figure skating
Figure skaters at the 1996 Asian Winter Games
Medalists at the 1996 Asian Winter Games
Asian Games silver medalists for Japan
Competitors at the 1997 Winter Universiade